The Butterfly is a one-design sailing dinghy, originally designed for a crew of two, but now most commonly raced single-handed. It was designed in 1961 in Libertyville, Illinois by John Barnett. The  hull is a scow design.  The craft has a stayed  mast set as a Marconi rig with a single mainsail with a  surface area.  The cockpit is 15 ½" deep, exceptionally deep for this size of sailboat, and can accommodate an adult up to 6 feet in height.

History
The boat was first designed by John Barnett of Libertyville, Illinois in 1961, who was inspired to make a smaller version of the C Scow, a popular sailing skiff. With the help of Dr. Robert Chamberlain, Mike Daskilakis, and Jim Miller the class was officially launched in 1962. The first Butterfly nationals was held at Grand Rapids Yacht Club in 1962, after which the boat was declared the official training boat of the Western Michigan Yachting Association. Barnett quickly moved production to Kenosha, Wisconsin where it stayed until he sold the company in 1982 to Hedlund Marine in Willmette, Illinois, but production was kept in Wisconsin. In 2007, Hedlund Marine sold production to Windward Boatworks of Princeton, Wisconsin.

Fleets
 Crystal Lake Yacht Club
 Glen Lake Yacht Club
 Grand Rapids Yacht Club
 Leland Yacht Club 
 Long Lake Yacht Club
 Missouri Yacht Club
 Muskegon Yacht Club
 Powers Lake Yacht Club
 Sail Dubay
 Camp Michigania Yacht Club
 Spring Lake Yacht Club
 Torch Lake Yacht Club
 Union Sailing Club
 White Lake Yacht Club
 White Rock Boat Club

Sources
National Butterfly Association:  boat specifications and class history

External links

 

Dinghies
1960s sailboat type designs
Scows